Margaret "Peggy" Olson is a fictional character and the female lead of the AMC television series Mad Men, and is portrayed by Elisabeth Moss. Initially, Peggy is secretary to Don Draper (Jon Hamm), creative director of the advertising agency Sterling Cooper. Later, she is promoted to copywriter, the first female writer at the firm since World War II. She later joins Draper when he leaves Sterling Cooper to become a founding member of Sterling Cooper Draper Pryce.  By the end of Season 4, Peggy is effectively Draper's second-in-command in the creative department. Towards the end of season five, Peggy accepts a job offer from another agency, CGC, and quits her job at Sterling Cooper Draper Pryce. However, following a merger between SCDP and CGC, Peggy finds herself working again with Don Draper.

Moss received critical acclaim for her performance and received six Primetime Emmy Award nominations, a Golden Globe nomination, three Critics' Choice Television Award nominations, and has been nominated for two individual nominations for the Screen Actors Guild Awards for her performance. She has also won two Screen Actors Guild Award for Outstanding Performance by an Ensemble in a Drama Series along with the cast of Mad Men.

Biography
Peggy Olson is initially presented as an innocent but determined young woman, eager to be a success in her job at Sterling Cooper after having graduated from the respected Miss Deaver's secretarial school. She was born on May 25, 1939, and was brought up in Bay Ridge, Brooklyn, New York in a Roman Catholic Norwegian and Irish-American family. When she was 12 years old, her father died of a heart attack in front of her.

Peggy has an immense dislike of the double standard in the treatment and expectations of men and women.

Lauren Chval of the Chicago Tribune wrote that Peggy's character "arc" showed the highest degree of change in the show, stating that "No other character has seen the same level of transformation."

At Sterling Cooper
In the pilot episode, "Smoke Gets in Your Eyes", which takes place in March 1960, Peggy begins work as a secretary for Don Draper (Jon Hamm).  Her supervisor, office manager Joan Holloway (Christina Hendricks), directs her in her duties as well as offers personal advice, which includes referring her to a gynecologist to obtain a prescription for birth control pills.  When Peggy initially meets account executive Pete Campbell (Vincent Kartheiser), he makes rude comments about her appearance, and Don defends her. Later that night, after his bachelor party, Pete shows up at Peggy's apartment drunk. Despite Pete's offensive remarks earlier, Peggy sleeps with him. Months later, Peggy and Pete have another sexual encounter on Pete's office couch, early one morning before other employees arrive.

In "Babylon", Sterling Cooper executive Freddy Rumsen (Joel Murray) notices Peggy's sharp mind and creativity during a focus group for Belle Jolie lipstick. After hearing Peggy's insightful remarks during a brainstorming session, Rumsen comments that her performance "was like watching a dog play the piano". She is asked to write some copy for the campaign in addition to her other duties. The campaign is a success, and she is made to work on other campaigns. As a result, she is soon promoted to Junior Copywriter and ceases being Don's secretary. She reveals herself to be highly ambitious, and her approach to her work is compared to Don's. Later, after Rumsen is fired, Peggy convinces Senior Partner Roger Sterling (John Slattery) to give her Rumsen's office.

During her first year at Sterling Cooper, Peggy begins to gain weight, which appears to confuse her. The male account executives begin to mock her, and Joan makes unkind remarks to her about her appearance in an attempt to encourage her to lose weight and dismisses her success at copywriting. When Peggy is promoted, she begins experiencing severe abdominal pain; she attributes it to a "bad sandwich" from the office cart and heads to St. Mary's Hospital in Brooklyn. She is shocked and in denial when informed she's actually in labor. As she gets up to leave, she collapses, and the hospital staff moves her into a hospital room in labor and delivery. She gives birth to a healthy baby boy, but she refuses to hold him or even look at him.

Season 2 begins 15 months later, on February 14, 1962, with a slim Peggy and no mention of the birth. Her long absence (not shown) is a mystery to Sterling Cooper's employees. One co-worker jokes during a meeting that "Draper knocked her up and she's dropped nine pounds, eight ounces." Pete has heard through office gossip that Peggy went to a fat farm.

It is revealed later in the season, through a series of flashbacks, that Peggy's family has covered up Peggy's sudden disappearance from Sterling Cooper. They tell Don that Peggy is in quarantine with tuberculosis, but she is actually in a mental hospital because she has had a break with reality after giving birth. Don becomes suspicious and seeks her out at the hospital. He encourages her to do whatever the doctors are asking her to do and move forward as if nothing ever happened, adding, "It will shock you how much this never happened."

Peggy's out-of-wedlock pregnancy causes tension with her deeply Catholic mother, Katherine, and sister, Anita. When a visiting parish priest, Father Gill (Colin Hanks), befriends Peggy after seeking out her advice regarding public speaking, Anita goes to confession and tells him that she hates and resents Peggy for seducing a married man, getting pregnant and abandoning her child, then pretending as though nothing happened. Afterward Father Gill repeatedly tries to persuade Peggy to take confession, which Peggy consistently declines to do. After season two, she is no longer seen attending mass, but notably performs the sign of the cross before taking her first plane flight in "Waterloo."

Toward the end of season two, Peggy becomes frustrated that she is often left out of business meetings that occur in mens-only environments after work hours. Joan advises her to "stop dressing like a little girl," which leads Peggy to start dressing more professionally and also to agree to a dramatic haircut from copywriter Kurt Smith (Edin Gali), who cuts her demure ponytail in favor of a shorter, more modern hairstyle.

In the Season 2 finale, set during the Cuban Missile Crisis, Pete confesses to Peggy that he's in love with her and wants to be with her. Peggy tells him she could have forced him to be with her if she wanted to, then confesses that he got her pregnant and she gave the baby away. Pete is stunned and even suggests it would have been better if he hadn't known.

In Season 3 (1963), Peggy's ideas for advertising, while respected, are frequently ignored. In particular, her comment that Salvatore Romano's (Bryan Batt) proposed ad campaign for Pepsi's new diet cola Patio (involving a shot-for-shot remake of Ann-Margret's opening scene in Bye Bye Birdie) would not appeal to the target audience, is dismissed. When the ad in question is shot down by Pepsi (whose idea it was in the first place), she smiles to herself. When she attempts to get a raise, Don shuts her down.

Due to the lengthy commute from Brooklyn, Peggy decides to move to an apartment in Manhattan. She posts an ad at SC for a roommate. Following Joan's advice to make her ad about fun and good times, and post it somewhere other than at SC, Peggy finds a prospective roommate in Karen Ericson (Carla Gallo); her conversation with Karen reveals that Peggy is Norwegian on her father's side.

Peggy becomes romantically involved with Duck Phillips (Mark Moses), who is seeking to lure her and Pete away to his firm. In considering the move, Peggy is motivated by how underutilized she has been at Sterling Cooper, and by Draper in particular, who has shut down her attempt to get a raise. As a result, when Don comes tells her to pack her things and join his new agency, Peggy refuses, noting that everyone thinks he does her work and that while she's had generous offers to join other agencies, Don ordered her to join him instead of actually asking her. Later, Don comes to Peggy at her apartment and tells her how much he values her, and that if she refuses again he'll spend the rest of his life trying to hire her. Peggy accepts his offer and becomes a part of Sterling Cooper Draper Pryce.

At Sterling Cooper Draper Pryce (SCDP)
In the fourth season (1964–65), Peggy perseveres as a trusted member of the SCDP creative staff, despite lingering resentment and patronizing behavior from most of the men she works with. Her affair with Duck has ended and she dates a young, weak-willed man named Mark (Blake Bashoff) but they break up when she chooses to work late instead of coming to a birthday dinner with her family he has planned. Peggy then meets political journalist Abe Drexler (Charlie Hofheimer) through her new friend Joyce Ramsay (Zosia Mamet), a photo editor for Life magazine. Peggy is initially repelled by Abe's criticisms of advertising and his dismissal of her struggles as a professional woman, but a romance develops between them.

When Lucky Strike, SCDP's biggest client, ends their relationship with the firm, Peggy is responsible for essentially saving the company by signing Topaz Pantyhose, breaking a long streak of clients either leaving SCDP or refusing to sign with them.

In season five, Peggy is given more responsibility, but her relationship with Don is strained as his new marriage to Megan causes him to neglect his work. She fails repeatedly to please Heinz Baked Beans's executive, and is finally removed from the account when she mimics Don's authoritative style but ends up offending the client instead.

Peggy also clashes with Art Director Stan Rizzo (Jay R. Ferguson), who antagonizes her by making crude passes at her. While they are spending the weekend together working in a hotel room, Peggy finally calls Stan's bluff and takes off her clothes. He does likewise and is alarmed that he's aroused by Peggy's body, which he has always insulted. Peggy is able to continue working productively, and afterward they have a more positive working relationship.

In the season five episode "The Other Woman", Peggy saves an account by coming up with an idea on the fly for an ad set in Paris. Her colleagues are impressed, but Don, frustrated by the lack of progress with another client, takes it out on Peggy and humiliates her. Peggy meets with Freddy Rumsen, who encourages her to move on from SCDP. Peggy then accepts an offer from another agency, Cutler, Gleason and Chaough, to become their Copy Chief with a generous salary. When she gives Don her notice, he initially doesn't believe her, then offers to beat whatever salary she's been offered, but Peggy remains firm, and Don kisses her hand before she leaves.

At Cutler, Gleason, and Chaough (CGC)
Peggy is widely respected by her superiors and feared by her subordinates at CGC. Her secretary recommends she try a little positive reinforcement along with her criticism, which gets mixed results. Peggy frequently works late, sharing gossip and news with Stan by phone. At one point, CGC partner Ted Chaough (Kevin Rahm) kisses Peggy, and later, she reveals she has feelings for him as well.

In "The Flood", Peggy is nominated for a prestigious advertising award for her Heinz Baked Beans ad, which she developed with Draper's wife, Megan (Jessica Paré). They are the only SCDP/SC&P nominees, despite the fact that neither works there anymore. The evening is interrupted by news of the assassination of Martin Luther King, Jr., and in a final frame showing the CLIO Award in Megan's living room, the audience learns that Megan and Peggy won the award.

When Draper and Ted join forces to pitch Chevrolet, leading the two firms to merge, they turn to Peggy to draft the press release. Both are oblivious to Peggy's distress.

At Sterling Cooper & Partners (SC&P)
When Draper starts a new firm called Sterling Cooper & Partners, he asks Peggy to join, with the promise of greater creative control and a bigger salary. Joan assigns Peggy to the office previously used by Harry Crane and Pete Campbell, which features an awkwardly placed pillar. Peggy has been unanimously declared Copy Chief but finds it very difficult to serve two masters, as she is almost continually put in the middle of Draper and Ted's leadership squabbles.

As Peggy's attraction to Ted grows, her relationship with Abe suffers. They grow further apart as his politics become more radical, and she becomes increasingly unhappy living in the building Abe suggested they buy, which is in a dangerous neighborhood, and decides to sell it. That night, while frightened, she accidentally stabs him. In the ambulance, Abe labels her an enemy to his beliefs, and they break up.

In "A Tale of Two Cities", Joan recruits Peggy to assist her in securing Avon as a client, but Peggy is distressed to discover that Joan has excluded Pete (whom Ted has ordered to handle that prospect) from the proceedings and is managing things on her own. Peggy and Joan have a heated discussion about their different paths to power. When Pete and Ted confront Joan, Peggy realizes Joan needs support from someone who believes in her, and so improvises a fake phone call to save Joan.

In "The Quality of Mercy", Draper and Megan catch Ted and Peggy together at the movies during a work day. Their affection for each other is apparent and problematic to everyone in the office. Draper criticizes Ted for allowing Peggy to exceed the budget on an overly expensive but brilliant television ad. In a client meeting, Draper soothes the client's worries about the expense (which could clearly jeopardize the account), but attributes the ad concept to the late Frank Gleason. While this tactic saves the account, it takes credit away from Peggy, who had hoped to win a CLIO Award for it. Draper also subtly alludes to an inappropriate relationship between Peggy and Ted (which only the SC&P insiders catch). After this, Ted backs off from his and Peggy's romantic relationship. After finding out that Draper is undermining both her professional and personal life, Peggy calls him "a monster".

In the Season 6 finale, "In Care Of", Peggy leaves the office for a date in a revealing dress, smelling of Chanel No. 5. When she returns, Ted is waiting at her apartment; he states that he loves her and plans to leave his wife, and he and Peggy consummate their relationship. The next morning, Ted asks Don to let him manage the SC&P office in California, in an effort to put as much distance between himself and Peggy as possible, and to achieve a fresh start with his family. Don eventually concedes, and Ted informs Peggy of his plans. Peggy is angered by Ted's unilateral decision and says, "Well, aren't you lucky, to have decisions?"

Draper's erratic attendance and behavior start to cause concern, and in the wake of a disastrous Hershey's pitch meeting, the partners place him on a leave of absence of unspecified duration. Peggy, again working late, takes over Draper's office.

In Season 7, Peggy becomes frustrated that Don's replacement, Lou, does not have the same standards and has little respect for her talents. She complains that the work is not as good as it was under Don, even though the company remains profitable, and dislikes working with Lou, who is dismissive and rude to Peggy.

She continues to live in the apartment building she owns and has developed a close friendship with Julio, a little boy who lives upstairs and comes over to watch television.

When Don returns to SC&P under numerous restrictions, Peggy is forced to bring him on as her subordinate for the Burger Chef campaign. Don at first is infuriated at having to work under his own protégé, refusing to turn in work, but soon resigns himself to the role, realizing he won't be able to return to his previous position if he doesn't cooperate. They create a great ad together, but Peggy is undercut when Pete insists that Don give the presentation. At the last minute, however, Don tells Peggy to do it. She gives a powerful presentation and wins the business for SC&P.

Peggy is reluctant to join McCann Erickson after they absorb SC&P, but a recruiter tells her that it's the best choice for her career at the moment. Stan goes with her, and soon afterward Joan tries to lure Peggy into her new film production company, but she chooses to stay in advertising.

Peggy is concerned for Don when he stops coming to work and basically vanishes. He calls her, deeply troubled, from a wellness retreat in California, telling her he realized he never said goodbye to her. Peggy tries to persuade him that he is not the bad person he thinks he is and tries to convince him to come home. After Don hangs up, she calls Stan and expresses concern. He comforts her and they finally admit they're in love with each other. Peggy is last seen working, with Stan embracing her lovingly.

Peggy's relationship with Don Draper
Peggy is Don's secretary until she is promoted, thanks to Freddy Rumsen's telling Don about how she acted during the Belle Jolie focus group. Don allows Peggy to work on accounts but tells her that she is still his secretary. Peggy is often openly resentful of Don's demanding requirements and his refusal to express appreciation for her work, but is also conscious that he is the only one in the firm who views her as an equal to her fellow copywriters, notwithstanding her gender. At the end of Season 1, Don gives her a raise and promotes her, meaning she will no longer work as his secretary. As the series progresses, they develop a work spouse type of relationship.

During Season 2, Peggy and Don's relationship deepens after Don drives while intoxicated and gets into a car accident. Having no one else to call and under arrest for drunk driving, he calls Peggy, who bails him and his mistress Bobbie Barret (Melinda McGraw) out of jail. Bobbie stays at Peggy's apartment for a few days and constantly asks Peggy why she is helping Don so much. It is revealed that at the end of Season 1, Peggy gave birth to a son, which she gave up for adoption. Traumatized by the experience, Peggy is forced to stay in the hospital for a long time, and Don was the only one who cared enough to investigate her whereabouts and is also the only one who visits her in the hospital, besides her mother. Peggy and Don have an intense conversation in the hospital, and he encourages her to do what the doctors are telling her to do. At the end of the episode, "The New Girl", Peggy calls him "Don" instead of "Mr. Draper", which she has been doing since the beginning of the series.

When in "Maidenform" (Season 2) Peggy questions her male colleagues' categorizations of women as "Marilyns" or "Jackies", and asks which she is, Ken quips that she's Gertrude Stein, and the younger men laugh. Don quickly counters that Peggy is Irene Dunne, which Freddy supports with, "I love Irene Dunne".

In Season 3, Don and Peggy continue to rely on each other. However, their relationship becomes strained due to Don's anger and seemingly lack of appreciation for Peggy and her work. When Don decides to start his own advertising agency, Peggy is one of the first people he talks to. He assumes she will quit Sterling Cooper and follow him to his new agency, but is surprised and hurt when she declines, stating that she's tired of being on the receiving end of his anger when something doesn't work out for him. Don later goes to Peggy's apartment, and the two have an emotional conversation, in which Don asks her to go with him to his new agency. When Peggy continues to express reluctance, Don tells her that if she doesn't go with him, he will spend the rest of his life trying to hire her. Matthew Weiner, the series' creator, head writer, and showrunner, has stated that this conversation is essentially Don telling Peggy that he loves her. 

Don and Peggy's relationship is further solidified in Season 4, when Don forces Peggy to work all night on her birthday (in "The Suitcase"). Though she is initially angry at Don for having to cancel dinner plans with her boyfriend to accommodate Don's work demands, Peggy and Don eventually make up and go to dinner.

They spend the night talking, and each reveals personal details about their life to the other. Peggy tells Don that her mother hates him because she thinks he fathered her baby. They also discuss the fact that everyone in the office assumes the two are either sleeping together or have slept together in the past.

Peggy asks him in a roundabout way why he never attempted to have an affair with her. He tells her that he has rules that he cannot break, to which she makes a snide remark and refers to his previous affairs. Peggy complains about dating, and Don responds that she's "cute as hell" and will find someone.

Peggy and Don return to the office building, where Peggy helps Don get through his drunken stupor. Duck unexpectedly shows up, also extremely drunk. He believes that Peggy and Don are romantically involved and calls her a whore. In response, Don attacks Duck, and the two drunkenly brawl. Peggy eventually gets Duck to leave and then returns to Don's office, where she finds him drinking again. Don apologizes to Peggy for embarrassing her, and the two fall asleep on his office couch with his head on Peggy's lap.

Later that morning, a distraught Don weeps in Peggy's presence after he learns of Anna's death over the telephone.  When Don tells Peggy that he has lost the only one in the world who truly knew him, Peggy tenderly places a consoling hand on his shoulder and replies, "That's not true." which appears to calm him down. Later that morning, a sober Don calls Peggy into his office to talk about the ad they had been struggling with. Don abruptly stops the work related conversation by holding Peggy's hand, as a sign of gratitude for everything she did the night before.

Peggy appears surprised and disappointed when Don announces his engagement to Megan Calvet, his secretary. Peggy congratulates Don, and Don replies that Megan admires her and that Megan reminds him a lot of Peggy. Peggy interprets the gesture as a backhanded compliment, and in a private chat with Joan remarks indignantly that Don seems more excited about marrying his secretary than about her own success. Joan tells Peggy that Don is no less superficial and shallow than any of their other male superiors, and his engagement to Megan should come as no surprise.

Peggy and Don's relationship becomes more strained after Don marries Megan and promotes her to copywriter at SCDP.  Peggy takes on the role of Megan's mentor and attempts to nurture her apparent talent (although it later turns out Megan is dissatisfied with being a copywriter).  Don also gives Peggy more responsibility, as he has begun spending more time at home than at work.  Peggy is often frustrated by her new workload, and matters do not improve when the agency hires another male copywriter - Michael Ginsberg - who seems to receive more credit than his supervisor Peggy does for the same amount of work.

After Peggy manages to save an account, she asks Don if she will be going to Paris with the remainder of the team and requests recognition for saving the Château Cheval Blanc client account (in the Season 5 episode, "The Other Woman"), Don grows angry and throws money in her face, assuming that she is asking for another raise.

This is Peggy's breaking point, and she realizes she can no longer stay at Sterling Cooper Draper Pryce.  Following Freddy Rumsen's advice, Peggy takes meetings with other agencies, ultimately choosing to go with Don's rival Ted Chaough at Cutler, Gleason, and Chaough, where she will receive more money and the title of Copy Chief.

Peggy breaks the news to Don immediately after he learns SCDP has landed Jaguar. Don mistakenly assumes she is asking for a raise and is shocked when she tells him that she's actually quitting. Don tells her to state the amount of money she is being offered at the other agency, and he will pay her more, but Peggy holds her ground. After using several failed tactics to get her to stay, Don gets increasingly emotional and angry, but finally accepts her two weeks' notice of resignation. He cruelly tells Peggy that she can leave that day instead of waiting the customary two weeks.

When Peggy holds out her hand for a handshake, Don takes her hand and kisses it, and refuses to let go until Peggy forcefully removes it. An emotional Peggy walks out, leaving Don distraught in his office.

In Season 6, SCDP and CGC merge, reuniting Peggy and  Don, much to Peggy's disappointment. Don and Peggy's relationship is at this point extremely strained, cemented by Don's alcoholism and his jealousy of Ted. Most of Don and Peggy's interactions during this season comprises their fighting over the fact that Don constantly puts her in the middle of arguments between him and Ted, which makes her uncomfortable. Don confronts Peggy after she refuses to pick a side, telling her that it's her job to pick the best idea. Peggy argues that he only gets angry when she refuses to pick a side or when she sides with Ted. She tells him that both he and Ted are similar, except that Ted never hurts her like Don does. Don replies, "He doesn't know you," and walks out, leaving Peggy shaken.

In the Season 6 finale ("In Care Of"), Don is set to move to California with Megan, but puts his marriage on the line by allowing Ted to take his place, in order to save Ted's marriage after Ted has slept with Peggy. When Ted tells Peggy he is leaving, she grows angry and assumes this is Don's doing as revenge for her affair with Ted, but is shocked and confused when Ted tells her that he asked Don, and Don accepted.

The other partners place Don on a forced leave due to his behavior, making Peggy SC&P's de facto creative director. In a much talked-about tableau, the season closes on a shot of Peggy sitting at Don's desk chair, gazing at the New York skyline, in a pose reminiscent of Don's in Mad Men's title card.

During the most of the first half of Season 7, Don and Peggy are not in communication since Don has been placed on leave - though it is revealed that Don has been submitting work to Peggy through Freddy Rumsen (Peggy assumes it is Freddy's work). When Don is in the office waiting to see if he will be allowed to return, Peggy tells Don that his presence was not missed. After Don is allowed to return to work full-time (with some conditions), both Don and Peggy avoid seeing or talking to each other. In the fourth episode of the season, "The Monolith", Peggy is told that Burger Chef is interested in running an ad campaign and she will be put in charge. She is thrilled until she is told that Don must be on her team for this assignment since he hasn't been doing much since his return. Peggy calls the team into her office and assigns each person to write 25 tags. She avoids making eye contact with Don, as he glares at her during the entire meeting. After the meeting, Don goes into his office and throws a typewriter at the wall.

He spends the rest of the episode defying Peggy's orders by refusing to complete the assignment and does not attend meetings that Peggy calls. After Don drinks heavily in the office, Freddy, who has been helping Don stay sober, comes to the office to take him home. After Don wakes up, Freddy lectures him and convinces Don to keep his head down and do the work. Don, now sober, goes back to the office and tells Peggy he will have by lunch the 25 taglines she asked for.

The tension between Peggy and Don continues until episode 6, "The Strategy". Peggy is still struggling with Burger Chef, and is further discouraged after Lou Avery and Pete Campbell tell her she needs to be "the voice of moms" with the campaign and that it must focus on a happy family life. She finally has what she feels is a good campaign, but is shaken after Don innocently suggests something different. This causes Peggy to doubt the campaign, and she goes into the office to work during the weekend. She calls Don on a Saturday to tell him that his idea was horrible, and to yell at him for expressing himself. She also accuses him of doing it on purpose since he knows she will fret over the campaign.

Don ignores her and continues to spend time with Megan, who is visiting from California over the weekend. However, Don cuts Megan's visit short, and instead goes to the office on Sunday to help Peggy. They argue initially, but as the night goes on, they begin to get along like they used to. They bond over the fact that they both believe that the perfect, nuclear families do not exist.

Don confesses to Peggy that he is afraid he has wasted his life, and he doesn't have anyone who cares for him. Peggy tells Don that she traveled to several different states and spoke to hundreds of Burger Chef customers, and begins to cry because she doesn't know what she did wrong with the campaign. Don comforts her and tells her she's doing a great job. He continues to encourage her, and Peggy finally comes up with the perfect idea for the campaign.

Don notices that Frank Sinatra's "My Way" is playing on the radio and asks Peggy to dance with him. As they dance, Peggy rests her head on Don's chest, and he kisses her head.

The next night, the two of them meet with Pete at a Burger Chef to talk about the new campaign. Pete is unhappy that they are changing everything at the last minute and blames Peggy, but Don stands up for her, and the three eat dinner together as a family.

Don has started to become responsible and reliable after their reconciliation, and he and Peggy continue to support and encourage each other. In the final episode of the season's first half, it is revealed that the Burger Chef team will be traveling to Indianapolis, and Don will be presenting the Burger Chef campaign. During the run through meeting, Pete begins to pick on them, but Peggy and Don stand up for one another.

While staying in a hotel in Indianapolis Don, Peggy, Harry, and Pete gather to watch the Moon landing together. Harry points out that Peggy only brought a beer for Don and herself (which Don opens for her). Don and Peggy sit close to each other on the hotel bed as the four of them watch  Neil Armstrong walk on the Moon.

Later that night, Don is informed that Sterling Cooper founder Bert Cooper (Robert Morse) has died and, as a result, he will be fired since Cooper's vote was needed for him to stay employed. Don immediately goes to Peggy's room and tells her she must do the Burger Chef presentation. He wants her to do it because if the meeting is a success, the account belongs to whoever did the presentation. Since he is getting fired, Don fears that if he does the presentation and it's successful, Peggy will be left with nothing. However, if she wins the account, she will be okay even if he leaves.

Peggy argues with him saying that it's too last minute, and she fears she will be unable to do it. Don encourages her, telling her he wouldn't be doing this if he genuinely didn't believe she could do it. Peggy continues to refuse, but finally accepts after Don tells her that although he hasn't watched her present, he has heard her - referring to the Season 6 premiere in which Don eavesdrops on Peggy's presentation with Heinz.

Don and Peggy smile at each other throughout the Burger Chef presentation. Then, they return to New York, where it is revealed that Don will be able to stay after Roger convinces another agency to buy them out, meaning they are an independent firm.

Peggy receives a call from Burger Chef saying they loved the presentation and want to get to work. She runs to tell Don, and the two happily share a hug.

During Season 7, after Peggy learns SCDP has been absorbed back into McCann-Erickson, she considers leaving entirely, but a headhunter convinces her that she is better off moving to McCann and remaining there for a few years, until she's built up her resume. Though frustrated by McCann's misogynistic culture and thrown by Don's sudden and unexplained departure, she is briefly tempted by Joan's proposal that they join forces and start their own agency. However, in the final episode, Peggy ultimately decides to stay at McCann, in part to remain with Stan, as they come to realize that a mutual love has developed between them.

References

External links
 Peggy Olson at AMCtv.com

Mad Men characters
Fictional secretaries
Fictional advertising executives
Fictional characters from Brooklyn
Fictional feminists and women's rights activists
Fictional female businesspeople
Television characters introduced in 2007
Fictional writers
American female characters in television